Bangabasi Evening College is an undergraduate liberal arts college affiliated with the University of Calcutta.
It is located at Sealdah in the heart of the city of Kolkata.

See also

References

External links
 Bangabasi Evening College Official Homepage
 http://www.bangabasievening.edu.in/?go=home
 https://web.archive.org/web/20151130010120/http://bangabasievening.in/
 https://web.archive.org/web/20150714001047/http://bangabasievening.in/NOTICE_UPLOAD/Eligibility_Criteria.pdf

Educational institutions established in 1965
University of Calcutta affiliates
1965 establishments in West Bengal